Robert Gary Donaldson (born July 15, 1952, in Trail, British Columbia) is a retired ice hockey player. He played one game for the Chicago Black Hawks of the National Hockey League and 5 games for the WHA's Houston Aeros.

See also
List of players who played only one game in the NHL

External links

1952 births
Living people
Canadian ice hockey forwards
Chicago Blackhawks draft picks
Chicago Blackhawks players
Houston Aeros (WHA) players
Sportspeople from Trail, British Columbia
Ice hockey people from British Columbia
Penticton Broncos players
Victoria Cougars (WHL) players